Ağyazı Buduq (also, Aghyazy Budug) is a village in the Khachmaz District of Azerbaijan. It has a population of 1,104.

References 

Populated places in Khachmaz District